Yangihayot is one of 12 city districts (tuman) of Tashkent, the capital of Uzbekistan. It was created in 2020 from parts of the city districts Sergeli and Bektemir, and parts of the districts Zangiota, Quyichirchiq, Yangiyoʻl and Oʻrtachirchiq of Tashkent Region.

References

Districts of Tashkent
Populated places established in 2020
2020 establishments in Uzbekistan